The Zoopagomycotina are a subdivision (incertae sedis) of the fungal division Zygomycota sensu lato. It contains 5 families and 20 genera. Relationships among and within subphyla of Zygomycota are poorly understood, and their monophyly remains in question, so they are sometimes referred to by the informal name zygomycetes.

Zoopagomycotina are microscopic and are typically obligate parasites of other zygomycete fungi and of microscopic soil animals such as nematodes, rotifers and amoebae. Some species are endoparasites that live mostly within the bodies of their hosts and only exit the host when they are producing spores. Other species are ectoparasites (e.g. Syncephalis, Piptocephalis) that live outside of the host body but produce specialized organs called haustoria that penetrate inside of the host body to capture host nutrients. Similar haustoria are found in biotrophic plant, animal and fungal pathogens in several other major fungal lineages.

Like most other zygomycete fungi, the Zoopagomycotina have cell walls containing chitin and have coenocytic (nonseptate) hyphae. Their vegetative body consists of a simple, branched or unbranched thallus. Asexual reproduction is by arthrospores (in Helicocephalum), chlamydospores, uni- or multi-spored sporganiola; sporangiospores of multi-spored formed in simple or branched chains (merosporangia), usually from a vesicle or stalk. Many produce haustoria. Where observed, the sexual spores (zygospores) are globose and unornamented. The hyphae used during sexual outcrossing is similar to vegetative hyphae or in some cases may be slightly enlarged.

Etymology
The word Zoopagomycotina comes from the Greek roots zoo meaning "animal" and pag meaning "rock" or "ice/frost".

Evolutionary relationships

Although great strides have been made in resolving the evolutionary relationships among many lineages of fungi, it has been challenging to resolve relationships within and among zygomycetes. For example, the uncertain grouping of Zoophagus insidians with the Kickxellomycotina.

Resolving a well-supported monophyly of the Zoopagomycotina has been particularly challenging for several main reasons:

 most species of Zoopagomycotina are microscopic and challenging to observe
 most species of Zoopagomycotina cannot be grown separately from their host organisms in axenic culture, so obtaining pure DNA for molecular studies is challenging
 based on ribosomal DNA sequences, species of Zoopagomycotina may have undergone accelerated evolution, so grouping may be skewed by long-branch attraction (LBA) and a high frequency of parallel evolutionary changes

Families and their respective genera
 Class Zoopagomycetes Doweld 2014
 Order Zoopagales Bessey 1950 ex. Benjamin 1979 [Zoophagales Doweld 2014] 
 Massartia De Wildeman 1897 non Conrad 1926
 Family Basidiolaceae Doweld 2013
 Basidiolum Cienk. 1861
 Family Cochlonemataceae Duddington 1974
 Amoebophilus (6 spp.) ectoparasite of amoebae
 Aenigmatomyces Castan˜eda & Kendrick 1993
 Aplectosoma (1 sp.) parasite of an amoeba
 Bdellospora (1 sp.) ectoparasite of an amoeba
 Cochlonema (19 spp.) endoparasites of amoebae and rhizopods
 Endocochlus (4 spp.) endoparasites of amoebae
 Euryancale (5 spp. ) endoparasites of nematodes
 Family Helicocephalidaceae Boedijn 1959
 Brachymyces (1 sp.) parasitic on bdelloid rotifers
 Helicocephalum (5 spp.) parasites of small animals, especially nematodes and nematode eggs
 Rhopalomyces (8 spp.) parasites of small animals, especially nematodes and nematode eggs
 Verrucocephalum Degawa 2013
 Family Piptocephalidaceae Schröter 1886
 Kuzuhaea (1 sp.) haustorial parasite of fungi (mostly of Mucorales spp.)
 Piptocephalis (25 spp.) haustorial parasite of fungi (mostly of Mucorales spp.)
 Syncephalis (61 spp.) haustorial parasite of fungi (mostly of Mortierellales and Mucorales spp.)
 Family Sigmoideomycetaceae Benny, Benjamin & Kirk 1992
 Reticulocephalis (2 spp.) putative haustorial parasite of fungi
 Sigmoideomyces (2 spp.) putative haustorial parasite of fungi
 Sphondylocephalum Stalpers 1974
 Thamnocephalis (3 spp.) haustorial parasite of fungi
 Family Zoopagaceae Drechsler 1938
 Acaulopage (27 spp.) haustorial parasites of amoeba 
 Cystopage (7 spp.) haustorial parasites of amoebae and nematodes
 Lecophagus Dick 1990
 Stylopage (18 spp.) predaceous on amoebae and nematodes
 Tentaculophagus Doweld 2014
 Zoopage (11 spp.) haustorial parasite of amoebae and testaceous rhizopods
 Zoophagus (5 spp.) ectoparasites of loricate rotifers and nematodes

References

External links
 Zygomycota at the Tree of Life Web Project
 Zygomycetes.org
 
 https://www.uniprot.org/taxonomy/451827
 https://web.archive.org/web/20110720003551/http://agclass.canr.msu.edu/mtwdk.exe?w=125844&k=default&s=5&t=2&n=1&l=60

Zygomycota